Radanovići (Serbian Cyrillic: Радановићи) is a small town in the municipality of Kotor, Montenegro. Town is also part and largest settlement of historical rural region of Grbalj at the coastal region of Montenegro. Town of Radanovići is located near the main road between Budva and Bay of Kotor region.

Demographics
Settlement has a population of 752 inhabitants according 2011 census and is mainly populated by Serbs (63,69%), with a significant population of Montenegrins (21,14%)

Transport
Town Radanovići is situated approximately halfway between two main Montenegrin tourist destinations, Budva and Kotor, on the main road that connects these two. Tivat Airport is 7,5 km (4,6 mi) away, and there are regular flights to Belgrade throughout the year, and dozens of charter planes land daily at Airport during the summer season.

Sports
Local football team OFK Grbalj play at Stadion Donja Sutvara and currently compete in the Montenegrin First League.

References

Populated places in Kotor Municipality